The General Staff H.Q. of the Kuwait Army redesignated in 1953 following formation in 1949, is a management department of the Kuwaiti Armed Forces, the national military of the State of Kuwait. The Chief of the General Staff is the senior combat military officer governing doctrines of the Kuwait Army, the Kuwait Air Force and the Kuwait Naval Force, but excludes the Kuwait National Guard, the Kuwait Police and Kuwait Fire Service Directorate. He is appointed by the Kuwait Defense Minister, a deputy prime minister, who is appointed by the Prime Minister of Kuwait; the latter appointed by the Emir of Kuwait, the Commander-in-chief of the Military of Kuwait.

Kuwait Army 

On 1 July 1961, when the ministry was not of birth yet during Operation Vantage; the Kuwait Army was the de facto command leadership of the available armed forces since establishment and acted as official minister advising the Emir of Kuwait on course of action. The Kuwait Army redesignated in 1953 was founded thirteen years before the enacting of the respective Kuwait ministry, mainly by Field Marshal Sheikh Abdullah Mubarak Al-Sabah in 1949.

List of Chiefs of the General Staff (1963–present)

List of Deputy Chiefs of the General Staff of Kuwait Armed Forces (1965–present)

Chief of the General Staff of Kuwait Armed Forces 
The joint offices of the assistants chief of general staff are tasked with delegating combat responsibility for logistics supply command, joint military operations, manpower and others.

The joint assistants chief of the general staff combat commanders are the chief combat commanders of the Kuwait Land Force, the Kuwait Air Force, and the Kuwait Naval Force.

Assistant Chief Commander of Kuwait Land Force 
The assistant chief combat commander of the Kuwait Army commands at his disposition the senior land combat officers and warrant officer commanders of the following infantry, mechanized infantry, artillery, commando, and tank brigades:
 Kuwait 6th Liberation Mechanized Brigade
 Kuwait 15th Mubarak Armored Brigade
 Kuwait 26th Al-Soor Mechanized Brigade
 Kuwait 35th Shahid Armored Brigade
 Kuwait 94th Saleh Al-Mohammed Mechanized Brigade

Assistant Chief Commander of Kuwait Air Force 
The assistant chief combat commander of the Kuwait Air Force commands at his disposition the senior air combat officers and warrant officer commanders of the following air bases and their combat operational assets:
 Abdullah Al-Mubarak Air Base
 Ali Al Salem Air Base
 Ahmad al-Jaber Air Base
 Air Defense Brigades

Assistant Chief Commander of Kuwait Naval Force 
The assistant chief combat commander of the Kuwait Naval Force commands at his disposition the senior naval combat officers, warrant officer, and commando warfighting naval commanders:
 Kuwait Marine Corps
 Kuwait Naval Warships

Notable officers of Kuwait Armed Forces 
 Fahad Al-Ahmed Al-Jaber Al-Sabah
 Mohammed Khaled Al-Khadher
 Mubarak Abdullah Al-Jaber Al-Sabah
 Sheikh Saleh Mohammed Al-Sabah

Notes

References 

Military of Kuwait
Kuwait